Shelleyan is an eponymous adjective that may refer to:

Percy Bysshe Shelley (1792–1822), English Romantic poet
Mary Shelley (1797-1851), English novelist and author of Frankenstein